Bussaglia is an Italian surname. Notable people with the surname include:

 Andrea Bussaglia (born 1997), Italian footballer
 Élise Bussaglia (born 1985), French footballer

See also
 Buscaglia

Italian-language surnames